Tony Barry (28 August 1941 – 21 December 2022) was an Australian actor and activist best known for his television and film roles.

Personal life
Barry was born in Ipswich, Queensland, on 28 August 1941. He had one son. Barry was an environmental and indigenous rights activist and considered himself "an honorary Kiwi". Barry is the only Australian who was featured on a New Zealand postage stamp. He took part in political rallies and was a volunteer for rehabilitation programs for indigenous rights groups. He visited high schools where he would promote environmentalism.

Health 
Barry was diagnosed with melanoma in the early 2000s. In 2014, between seasons of the television drama series The Time of Our Lives, Barry had his left leg amputated above the knee due to the illness. The loss of his leg was written into the storyline. Due to this illness, he died on 21 December 2022, at age 81, in Murwillumbah, New South Wales.

Career 
Barry performed in nearly 60 feature films and over 45 television series, across a five-decade career, in both Australia and New Zealand. The longevity of Barry's acting career was recognised when he received the 2014 Film Critics Circle of Australia award for his "extraordinary contribution to the Australian film industry".

After acting in the television series The Box from 1975 to 1976, Barry began his film career in 1977 with The Mango Tree. Roles followed in a range of acclaimed Australian and New Zealand films, including Newsfront, The Odd Angry Shot, We of the Never Never, Australia and Home for Christmas, for which he won Best Actor in the 2010 New Zealand Film and TV Awards.

Filmography

Live theatre

References

External links
 
 

1941 births
2022 deaths
20th-century Australian male actors
21st-century Australian male actors
Australian amputees
Australian male film actors
Australian male television actors
Deaths from cancer in New South Wales
Deaths from melanoma
People from Ipswich, Queensland